Clive George Wright, Jr. (born 18 November 1965) is a Jamaican former track and field sprinter who specialised in the 200 metres. He won several medals with the Jamaican relay team, taking Jamaica's first World Championships relay medal (a bronze) at the 1987 World Championships in Athletics, as well as a bronze medal at the Pan American Games in 1987 and two relay bronze medals at the 1990 Commonwealth Games.

He was a four-time Jamaican champion in the 200 m and held a personal best of 20.50 seconds for the distance. He represented his country in that event at the Summer Olympics in 1988 and 1992.

Career
Born in Dover in Saint Mary Parish, Jamaica, he did not compete at a high level in his youth but rose to prominence at senior level at the age of twenty-one. He won his first 200 metres title at the Jamaican Athletics Championships that year and made his international debut. First came a run at the 1987 IAAF World Indoor Championships, where he narrowly missed qualifying for the 200 m final. He won double gold at the 1987 Central American and Caribbean Championships in Athletics in the 200 m and 4×100 metres relay. The 1987 Pan American Games followed and he placed fifth in the 200 m before taking a relay bronze medal as part of a quartet with Ray Stewart, Andrew Smith and John Mair. The team regrouped for the 1987 World Championships in Athletics, with Wright running the bend, and won another bronze medal – the first time that Jamaican men won a relay medal at the competition. Wright also ran individually for Jamaica and ran in the semi-finals to a career best of 20.50 seconds.

He defended his national title in the 200 m the following year and then made his Olympic debut. At the 1988 Seoul Olympics he was eliminated in the quarter-finals of the individual 200 m, then joined up with Christopher Faulknor, Greg Meghoo, and John Mair for the relay. The team came close to their World Championship medal-winning time in the 4×100 m relay final, but ended in fourth behind the French team who were seven hundredths faster. After a third straight Jamaican Championships win, he attempted a defence of his two regional titles at the 1989 Central American and Caribbean Championships in Athletics but came up two hundredths short behind host nation athlete Edgardo Guilbe in the 200 m. With the Jamaican men he managed to defend the relay title. Two bronze medals awaited Wright at the 1990 Commonwealth Games, as the Jamaican men took third in both the 4×100 m relay and 4×400 metres relay (Mair and Wright ran in both teams, with Ray Stewart and Wayne Watson being in the 100 m team and Devon Morris and Howard Burnett in the longer sprint quartet). Wright also placed seventh in the semi-finals of the 200 m individually.

After a defeat to Windell Dobson in 1991, Wright won the fourth (and last) Jamaican 200 m championship in 1992. This gained him  the Jamaican Olympic team for the 1992 Barcelona Olympics. He was omitted from the relay squad, but had his best Olympic finish in the 200 m individual event, coming seventh in his semi-final. This proved to be his last season at the top level, both nationally and internationally.

National titles
Jamaican Athletics Championships
200 metres: 1987, 1988, 1989, 1992

International competitions

See also
List of 200 metres national champions (men)
4×100 metres relay at the World Championships in Athletics

References

External links

Living people
1965 births
People from Saint Mary Parish, Jamaica
Jamaican male sprinters
Olympic athletes of Jamaica
Athletes (track and field) at the 1988 Summer Olympics
Athletes (track and field) at the 1992 Summer Olympics
World Athletics Championships athletes for Jamaica
World Athletics Championships medalists
Pan American Games medalists in athletics (track and field)
Athletes (track and field) at the 1987 Pan American Games
Athletes (track and field) at the 1991 Pan American Games
Athletes (track and field) at the 1995 Pan American Games
Commonwealth Games medallists in athletics
Athletes (track and field) at the 1990 Commonwealth Games
Commonwealth Games bronze medallists for Jamaica
Pan American Games bronze medalists for Jamaica
Medalists at the 1987 Pan American Games
Medallists at the 1990 Commonwealth Games